Phragmotheca is a genus of flowering plants in the family Malvaceae.

Selected species
It contains the following species:
 Phragmotheca rubriflora

References

Bombacoideae
Malvaceae genera
Taxonomy articles created by Polbot